Sand skiing (occasionally sand-skiing) is a sport and form of skiing in which the skier rides down a sand dune or strides across a beach on skis. It is practised in many sandy areas, including Sossusvlei, Namibia and Peru, along with other boardsports such as sandboarding. Sand skiing equipment includes a pair of skis with a laminate base and wax that needs to be applied to reduce friction from the sand. An International Sandboarding and Sandski Association (InterSands) was founded in 2014 at St. Gallen, Switzerland.

Henrik May, a German living in Namibia for some 10 years, set a Guinness World Record in speed sand-skiing on 6 June 2010. He reached a speed of 92.12 km/h. 

Competitions over the years have included:
 International Sand Ski Tournament in Florida held from 1949 to 1951
 Sandblast held in Prince George, British Columbia annually from 1971 to 2003
 World Sand Skiing Championships held at Redondo Beach, CA
 Nevada Sand Mountain GS Championship
 international European championships in sand skiing held regularly on Monte Kaolino since 2007
 Freestyle SandSnow was first held in 2018

In 2018, Fayoum University held a sand skiing event in Fayoum with students from around Egypt joining in on the fun.

History

Skiing on sand has been reported before 1920 in Germany,
 in 1927 Sahara, on an Asian expedition and throughout the 1930s in 
Great Sand Dunes National Park, Colorado
French Algeria
Cronulla sand dunes, Australia
Venice Beach, California
Shirahama Beach, Japan
Peru
Cape Cod, Massachusetts
Long Island, New York
Tadoussac, Canada
Death Valley, California
Camber Sands, England

See also 
dry ski slopes
roller skis
grass skiing
Lençóis Maranhenses National Park

References

External links

Skiing
Sand